The Trail of Tears: Cherokee Legacy is a 2006 documentary by Rich-Heape Films.  It presents the history of the forcible removal and relocation of Cherokee people from southeastern states of the United States to territories west of the Mississippi River, particularly to the Indian Territory in the future Oklahoma.

Historical context

This removal in the 1830s has been popularly referred to as the "Trail of Tears."  It followed the Indian Removal Act of 1830.  This action was part of a larger United States policy of Indian removal.

Appearances

Actor Wes Studi as on-camera presenter James Earl Jones narrated the film. Other celebrities providing voices for the film include James Garner, Crystal Gayle, and Wilma Mankiller. Native American and other history professors make on-camera narrative observations. The film includes speech in the Cherokee language.

Details
MPAA rating: none
Running time: 115 minutes

Awards received
2007 Silver World Medal for History, New York Film Festival
2008 Best Documentary, American Indian Film Festival

See also
Cherokeelegence
Five Civilized Tribes
Indian removal
Andrew Jackson
Trail of Tears

External links
Allmovie.com site for film

PBS article on Indian removal

2006 films
Documentary films about Native Americans
Documentary films about United States history
2006 documentary films
Cherokee in popular culture